Custer County is a county located in the U.S. state of Montana. As of the 2020 census, the population was 11,867. Its county seat is Miles City. The county was established on June 2, 1865 as one of the nine original counties of the Territory of Montana named Big Horn County, and was renamed on February 16, 1877 in honor of Lieutenant Colonel George Armstrong Custer.

Geography

Climate

According to the Köppen Climate Classification system, Custer County has a mostly cold semi-arid climate, abbreviated "BSk" on climate maps.

Major highways

  Interstate 94
  U.S. Highway 12
  U.S. Highway 212
  Montana Highway 59

Adjacent counties

 Prairie County - north
 Fallon County - east
 Carter County - southeast
 Powder River County - south
 Rosebud County - west
 Garfield County - northwest

Politics

Demographics

2000 census
At the 2000 United States census, there were 11,696 people, 4,768 households and 3,089 families living in the county. The population density was 3 per square mile (1/km2). There were 5,360 housing units at an average density of 1 per square mile (1/km2). The racial makeup of the county was 97.02% White, 0.09% Black or African American, 1.27% Native American, 0.26% Asian, 0.05% Pacific Islander, 0.34% from other races, and 0.97% from two or more races. 1.51% of the population were Hispanic or Latino of any race. 34.3% were of German, 12.0% Norwegian, 8.4% English, 8.3% Irish and 5.4% American ancestry. 96.8% spoke English, 1.5% Spanish and 1.2% German as their first language.

There were 4,768 households, of which 30.40% had children under the age of 18 living with them, 51.10% were married couples living together, 10.00% had a female householder with no husband present, and 35.20% were non-families. 29.90% of all households were made up of individuals, and 12.30% had someone living alone who was 65 years of age or older. The average household size was 2.36 and the average family size was 2.94.

25.10% of the population were under the age of 18, 8.40% from 18 to 24, 25.60% from 25 to 44, 23.80% from 45 to 64, and 17.10% who were 65 years of age or older. The median age was 39 years. For every 100 females there were 95.80 males. For every 100 females age 18 and over, there were 91.20 males.

The median household income was $30,000 and the median family income was $38,779. Males had a median income of $27,857 compared with $18,343 for females. The per capita income for the county was $15,876. About 10.10% of families and 15.10% of the population were below the poverty line, including 18.10% of those under age 18 and 9.10% of those age 65 or over.

2010 census
As of the 2010 United States census, there were 11,699 people, 5,031 households, and 3,014 families living in the county. The racial makeup of the county was 95.5% white, 1.7% American Indian, 0.3% black or African American, 0.3% Asian, 0.1% Pacific islander, 0.5% from other races, and 1.6% from two or more races. Those of Hispanic or Latino origin made up 2.2% of the population. In terms of ancestry, 33.6% were German, 18.3% were Irish, 14.3% were American, 14.1% were Norwegian, and 10.6% were English.

Of the 5,031 households, 27.3% had children under the age of 18 living with them, 46.6% were married couples living together, 9.0% had a female householder with no husband present, 40.1% were non-families, and 34.3% of all households were made up of individuals. The average household size was 2.24 and the average family size was 2.88. The median age was 42.1 years.

The median income for a household in the county was $38,913 and the median income for a family was $49,011. Males had a median income of $37,535 versus $26,576 for females. The per capita income for the county was $21,676. About 12.4% of families and 15.7% of the population were below the poverty line, including 19.8% of those under age 18 and 14.6% of those age 65 or over.

Economy
Agriculture (dryland farming) and cattle raising provide the bulk of Custer County economy. Miles City serves as the center of commerce in an area extending for 100 miles in every direction.  As of 2009 the county's largest employers were Holy Rosary Healthcare, Sanjel USA, Stockman Bank, and Walmart.

Communities

City
 Miles City (county seat)

Town
 Ismay

Unincorporated communities

 Bonfield, Montana
 Kinsey
 Knowlton, Montana
 Mizpah, Montana
 Tusler, Montana
 Volborg

See also
 List of lakes in Custer County, Montana
 List of mountains in Custer County, Montana
 National Register of Historic Places listings in Custer County, Montana

References

 
1877 establishments in Montana Territory
Populated places established in 1877